Kane Tucker (born 12 March 2000) is an Irish amateur boxer. He competes at Light-Heavyweight (81 kg). Tucker trains at Emerald ABC Belfast, under Harry Hawkins.

Amateur career

National Titles
Kane Tucker has an impressive underage record with successfully obtaining nine consecutive Irish amateur titles.

2014 European Schoolboys Championships
Tucker won his first major international medal, a 63 kg bronze, at the 2014 European Schoolboys Championships in Keszthely, Hungary in 2014.

Results:Light Welterweight (63 kg) GOLD: TCAMBOV Edgard (RUS)SILVER: SIMONOVIC Nikola (SRB)BRONZE: TUCKER Kane (IRL)BRONZE: ZAK Yan (ISR)

2017 Commonwealth Youth Games
Tucker found his second success internationally in 2017, representing Northern Ireland in the Commonwealth Youth Games in Nassau, Bahamas. He was awarded a silver medal following a narrow defeat to England in the final bout of the contest.

Results:Middleweight (75 kg)
GOLD: Aaron Patrick Bowen (ENG)
SILVER: Kane Tucker (NIR)
BRONZE: Kyle Ting Chen (NZL) 
BRONZE: Satwinder Thind (CAN)

References

2000 births
Living people
Male boxers from Northern Ireland
Light-heavyweight boxers